Myelin protein zero-like protein 1 is a protein that in humans is encoded by the MPZL1 gene.

References

Further reading